JobPath is an approach to employment activation in Ireland which caters mainly for people who are long-term unemployed   to assist them to secure and sustain full-time paid employment or self-employment.

Following the completion of a public procurement process, contracts to deliver JobPath were signed with two companies – Seetec Limited and Turas Nua Limited. These companies are providing JobPath services in two contract areas that are based on the department's divisional structure.

References 

Employment
Department of Social Protection
Labour in the Republic of Ireland